Disney's Pocahontas is a platform game based on the 1995 film of the same name. The Genesis / Mega Drive version was developed by Funcom on contract with Disney and was released on January 1, 1996. It was followed by a later version for the Game Boy developed by Tiertex Design Studios and released on June 10, 1996, nearly a year after the film's premiere. A Super Nintendo Entertainment System version of the game was under, but canceled due to development being too far behind the Genesis release.

Gameplay
In the game, the player plays as Pocahontas and Meeko, switching between the two frequently to overcome obstacles, with the help of Flit as an NPC. Along the way, the player gains various new abilities from various animal spirits by helping them. The game follows the plot of the film, but with many variations in situations and events.

Reception

The Genesis version was moderately well received by critics. The four reviewers of Electronic Gaming Monthly criticized the controls but praised the graphics and especially the innovative and challenging puzzle design. GamePro, in contrast, found the puzzles to be easy and uninteresting, but felt this was appropriate for the game's young target audience and also praised the graphics.

References

External links

1996 video games
Sega video games
Single-player video games
THQ games
Funcom games
Game Boy games
Sega Genesis games
Tiertex Design Studios games
Side-scrolling platform games
Cancelled Super Nintendo Entertainment System games
Pocahontas (franchise)
Video games based on Native American mythology
Video games based on real people
Video games based on animated films
Video games featuring female protagonists
Video games about raccoons
Video games about birds
Video games set in the 17th century
Video games set in Virginia
Video games set in forests
Video games developed in Norway
Disney video games
Video games developed in the United Kingdom
Black Pearl Software games